Badagam is a small village in the Rayagada Block and Parlakhemundi municipality in Gajapati district in the Indian state of Odisha. The major languages spoken in this place are Kui and Oriya.

Demographics 

As of 2001 India census, Badagam had a population of 720. Males constitute 49% of the population and females 51%. Badagam has a literacy rate of 95%, higher than the Gajapati district`s average of 61%.

The majority of the people residing in Badagam are Hindu. Christians are the second largest religious community.

State-->Odisha,  District-->Gajapati district,      Tahsil-->Parlakhemundi,   Village--> Badagam,       Male Population-->640,   Female Population-->660,
Total Population-->1300

History 

The Binnala, Gedela, Kappala, Routhu and Sivala are the known and ancient families staying here for the last 100 years since the Madras Presidency days.

After the formation of Odisha Badagam was earlier under the Ganjam district which is now part of the new Gajapati district which came into being with effect from 2 October 1992. Prior to this it was a part (Sub-Division) of Ganjam district.

Geography and climate 

Landscape
Badagam lies in the south-east of the east Indian state of Odisha. It is close to the banks of Mahendratanaya River and few miles away from the Bay of Bengal. The climate is subtropical with high humidity. The temperature varies between 18 and 48 degrees Celsius. Summer is extremely hot with some thunderstorms and minor cyclones.
Badagam receives rainfall from the southwest monsoons, and the wettest months are July, August and September.

Education 

Schools located in the village include Govt Boys' High School built by Gopi Nath Naidu few decades ago and now dedicated to the Government of Odisha.
The Famous SKCG College and Centurion University are just few miles away.
Literacy rate has rapidly grown up in the last decade. People started focusing towards technical education, and there are many employees across India and the globe (Singapore, US, Dubai) who represent Badagam.
Most of the employees of Badagam are teachers and Army personnel representing India.

Badagam Govt. School --> Primary School

NM High School,

SKCG and Centurion University -->Graduation and PG schools

Civic Administration 

This village comes under the Narayanapur Panchayat and 
Rayagada Block. It comes under the Gajapati district where Parlakhemundi  is the headquarters.

Economy 
Agriculture is the main source of income.
The village has around six rice mills and six cashew factories providing employment to the residents of the village and other neighboring villages in the Rayagada Block and Gajapati district.
Average income of this village is 8000 per month, much better than the average income of the district and state.
With the labour cost increasing day by day, people are slowly migrating to business. Farmers/Landlords here are now outnumbered.
Labour from this area is migrating to Hyderabad of neighbouring AP.

Transport 

Badagam is connected to other parts of Odisha by the State Highway No. 17 which connects Berhampur at one end and Rayagada on the other. The nearest major town Parlakhemundi is just fifteen kilometers. Palasa is just forty kilometers away and Berhampur is 120 km away. The nearest National Highway (N.H–5) junction is at around forty kilometers from Badagam. The nearest operational railway station is Parlakhemundi which is 15 km away. The narrow gauge railway line (called Naupada-Gunupur Rail line) running through this town has been converted to broad gauge, and starting 20 December 2010 a regular train started from Paralakhemundi to Puri.

The nearest Airport is the Visakhapatnam Airport, which is at a distance of 180 km.

The O.S.R.T.C. (Odisha State Road Transport Corporation) and private buses connect the town to other parts of Odisha and nearby towns of Andhra Pradesh. The town is well connected to Bhubaneswar, Bramhapur, Rayagada, Jeypore, Gunupur, Visakhapatnam, Srikakulam, Palasa, Bhawanipatna, Nabrangpur, Cuttack, Rourkela, etc. by road.

Narayanapur Panchayat.
Badagam is well Developed having Good Motors and Borewells for Irrigation.
Having Rice Mills and Cashew Factories for the local employment.
Badagam is part of Brahmapur (Lok Sabha constituency) and part of Rayagada block (Assembly constituency).

Villages in Gajapati district